Mousa Al-Barakah (Arabic:موسى البركة) (born 1 January 1989) is a Qatari footballer who played as a defender in the Qatar Stars League, mostly for Al-Arabi SC.

External links
 

Qatari footballers
1989 births
Living people
Al-Arabi SC (Qatar) players
El Jaish SC players
Al-Sailiya SC players
Muaither SC players
Qatar Stars League players
Qatari Second Division players
Association football defenders